Therapontigonus may refer to:
 a character in the play Curculio, a Latin comedic play for the early Roman theatre by Titus Maccius Plautus
 Therapontigonus (weevil), a beetle genus in the tribe Peritelini